Apeplopoda is a genus of tiger moths in the family Erebidae. The genus was erected by Watson in 1980.

Species
Apeplopoda improvisa (Schaus, 1912)
Apeplopoda mecrida (H. Druce, 1889)
Apeplopoda ochracea (Felder, 1874)

References

Euchromiina
Moth genera